This is a list of the first minority male lawyer(s) and judge(s) in California. It includes the year in which the men were admitted to practice law (in parentheses). Also included are other distinctions such as the first minority men in their state to graduate from law school or become a political figure.

Firsts in state history

Law school  

You Chung Hong (1923): First Chinese American male law graduate in California (1925)

Lawyers 

John Rollin Ridge (Yellow Bird) (c. 1840s): First Native American (Cherokee) lawyer in California
R.C.O. Benjamin (1884): First African American male lawyer in California
Hong Yen Chang (1888): First Chinese American male lawyer in the U.S., but was denied the right to practice law in California
Theodore Grady (1897): First deaf male lawyer in California
 Charles S. Darden (1906): First African American male lawyer to argue a case before the Supreme Court of California (c. 1920s)
Oscar Hudson (1911): First African American male admitted to the State Bar of California
Chan Chung Wing (1918): First Chinese American male lawyer to pass the California Bar exam
 Kenji Ito (1945): First Japanese American male lawyer post-WWII in California
Cruz Reynoso (1959): First Latino American male admitted to the State Bar of California
Paul C. Lo (1994): First Hmong American male admitted to the State Bar of California
Sergio C. Garcia (2014): First undocumented immigrant male admitted to the State Bar of California

Judicial officers

State

Justice of the Peace  

 Charles S. Darden (1906): First African American male to seek a judgeship in California (he was nominated for the police court in 1906, though he would withdraw from the nomination). 
Oscar Overr: First African American to serve as a Justice of the Peace in California (1914)

Judges 

Edwin L. Jefferson (1931): First African American male judge in California (1941)
Ralph Moradian (1934): First male of Armenian descent to become a judge in California (1963)
David W. Williams (1937): He was considered "the first African-American federal judge west of the Mississippi." (1969)
John Aiso (1941): First Japanese American male judge in California (1952)
Delbert E. Wong (1948): First Chinese American male judge in California (1959)
Allen Broussard (1954): First African American male judge to serve as the President of the California Judges Association (1972)
Stephen Lachs (1963): First openly LGBT male judge in California (1979)
Kenneth Chang (1963): First Korean American male judge in California (1980)
 Fred W. Gabourie (1965): First Native American (Seneca people) male judge in California (1976)
Mel Red Recana (1974): First Filipino American male judge in California (1981)
Thang Nguyen Barrett (1988): First Vietnamese American male judge in California (1997)
Paul C. Lo (1994): First Hmong American male judge in California (2013)
Firdaus Dordi (1996): First Zoroastrian male judge in California (2017)
Halim Dhanidina (1997): First Muslim American male judge in California (2012)
Aruna P. Rodrigo (2008): First Sri Lankan American male judge in California (2021)

Appellate Court 

Cruz Reynoso (1959): First Latino American male appointed to the California Court of Appeal (1976)
 Stephen K. Tamura: First Japanese American male appointed as a Judge of the Court of Appeal in California (1966)
Rosendo Peña (1980): First Latino American male appointed as a Judge of the Fifth District Court of Appeals in California (2012)
Jim Humes (c. 1983): First openly LGBT male appointed as a Judge of the California Court of Appeals (2012)
Richard T. Fields (1983): First African American male appointed as a Judge of the Fourth District Court of Appeals in California (2016)
 Luis A. Lavin (1985): First openly LGBT male appointed as a Judge of the Second District Court of Appeals in California (2015)
 M. Bruce Smith (1988): First African American male appointed as a Judge of the Fifth District Court of Appeals in California (2014)
 Miguel Márquez (1996): First Latino American male appointed as a Judge of the Sixth District Court of Appeals in California (2012)
 Gabriel P. Sanchez: First Latino American male appointed as a Judge of the First District Court of Appeals in California (2018)
 Maurice Sanchez: First Latino American male appointed as a Judge of the Third District Court of Appeal in California (2022)

Supreme Court 

Henry A. Lyons: First Jewish American male appointed as a Justice of the California Supreme Court (1849)
Solomon Heydenfeldt: First Jewish American male elected as a Justice of the California Supreme Court (1852)
Wiley Manuel (1954): First African American male appointed as a Justice of the California Supreme Court (1977)
Cruz Reynoso (1959): First Latino American male appointed as a Justice of the California Supreme Court (1981)
Martin Jenkins (1981): First openly LGBT (African-American) male appointed as a Justice of the California Supreme Court (2020)

Federal

District Court 

Manuel Real: First Latino American male appointed as a Judge of the U.S. District Court for the Central District of California (1966)
Earl Ben Gilliam (1957): First African American male appointed as a Judge of the U.S. District Court for the Southern District of California (1980)
Robert Aguilar (1958): First Latino American male appointed as a Judge of the U.S. District Court for the Northern District of California (1980)
Dickran Tevrizian (1965): First male of Armenian descent to become a Judge of the U.S. District Court for the Central District of California (1985)
Ronald S. W. Lew (1971): First Chinese American male appointed as a Judge of the U.S. District Court for the Central District of California (1987)
Thelton Henderson (1962): First African American male appointed as the Chief Judge of the U.S. District Court of Northern California (1990)
Garland Ellis Burrell Jr. (1976): First African American male appointed as a Judge of the U.S. District Court for the Eastern District of California (1991)
Robert Mitsuhiro Takasugi: First Japanese American male to serve as Judge of the U.S. District Court for the Central District of California (1996)
Edward M. Chen (1980): First Asian American male appointed as a Judge of the U.S. District Court for the Northern District of California (2011)
Michael W. Fitzgerald (1985): First openly LGBT male appointed as a Judge of the U.S. District Court for the Central District of California (2012)
 Vijay Gandhi (1997): First Indian American male judge appointed as a Judge of the U.S. District Court for the Central District of California (2010)
Vince Chhabria (1998): First Indian American male appointed as a Judge of the U.S. District Court for the Northern District of California (2014)

Bankruptcy Court 

 Robert Kwan: First male of Chinese ancestry to serve as a Judge of the United States Bankruptcy Court for the Central District of California (2007)

Circuit Court 

Arthur Alarcón: First Latino American male appointed as a Judge of the U.S. Court of Appeals for the Ninth Circuit in California (1979)

Attorney General 

 Xavier Becerra (1985): First Latino American male lawyer to be appointed as the Attorney General of California (2017)
Rob Bonta (1999): First Filipino American male lawyer to be appointed as the Attorney General of California (2021)

Deputy Attorney General 

 Delbert E. Wong (1948): First Chinese American male appointed as a Deputy Attorney General in California (1952)

Assistant Attorney General 

 Franklin Williams: First African American male to serve as the Assistant Attorney General of California (1959)

United States Attorney 

Cecil F. Poole (1939): First African American male to serve as the U.S. Attorney for the Northern District of California (1961)
André Birotte Jr. (1991): First African American male U.S. Attorney for the Central District (2010). He would later become a district court judge.

District Attorney  

 Christopher W. Smith (1959): First African American male to serve as a District Attorney in California (1977-1981)

City Attorney 

 Mikio Uchiyama (1953): First Japanese American male to serve as a City Attorney in California

Political office 

Charles Calderon (1976): First Hispanic American male lawyer to become a Senate Majority Leader in California (1996)

Bar Association 

 Samuel L. Williams: First African American male to serve as the President of the State Bar of California (1981)
 Luis Rodriguez: First Latino American male to serve as the President of the State Bar of California (2013)
 Michael Colantuono: First openly LGBT male to serve as the President of the State Bar of California (2017)
Ronald E. Albers: First openly LGBT male to serve as the Vice-President of the State Bar of California

Firsts in local history 
Alphabetized by county name

Region 

 Lewis A. Franklin (1853): First Jewish male lawyer in Southern California (c. 1850s) (specifically San Diego, California)
Wayne M. Kanemoto (1943): First Japanese American male judge in Northern California (Santa Clara County, California; 1962)
Cecil F. Poole (1939): First African American male to serve as a federal judge in Northern California (1976)
Mikio Uchiyama (1953): First Japanese American male judge in Central California (Fresno County, California; 1968)
Edward M. Chen (1980): First Asian American male federal district court judge in Northern California's history
Sunil Kulkarni (1996): First South Asian American male judge in Northern California (2013)

Alameda County 

James Wilson: First African American male to apply for admittance to the Alameda County Bar Association. He was denied entry. 
Washington J. Oglesby: Admitted to practice in 1897, he is one of the first African American attorneys to practice law in the City of Oakland, Alameda County, California.
Motoyuki Negoro: First Japanese male to graduate with a degree from the UC Berkeley School of Law (1907). He was unable to practice law due to being a resident alien. 
Lawrence Sledge (1908): An early African American male lawyer who practiced law in the City of Oakland, Alameda County, California, around 1908. 
Walter Gordon: First African American male law graduate from the University of California, Berkeley (1922) [Alameda County, California]
Lionel Wilson (1950): First African American male judge in Alameda County, California (1960)
Carl Metoyer (1953): First African American male to serve as the President of the Alameda County Bar Association (1970)
Ming Chin (1967): First Asian American male to serve as the President of the Alameda County Bar Association (c. 1987)
 Ken M. Kawaichi: First Asian American male judge in Alameda County, California (1980)
Carlos Ynostroza (1969): First Latino American male judge in Alameda County, California (1980)
 Keith H. Fudenna (1974): First Asian American male appointed as a Judge of the Municipal Court to the Fremont-Newark-Union City Municipal Court (Alameda County, California; 1997)
 Tom Reardon: First openly LGBT male to serve as a Judge of the Alameda County Superior Court (c. 1998)
Brendon Woods: First African American male to serve as the Public Defender of Alameda County (2012)
 Somnath Raj Chatterjee (1995): First South Asian male appointed as a Judge of the Alameda County Superior Court (2017)

Alpine County 

 Christopher W. Smith (1959): First African American male to serve as a District Attorney in Alpine County, California (1977-1981)

Butte County 

 Jesus A. Rodriguez: First Latino American male judge in Butte County, California (2018)

Contra Costa County 

 George Carroll (1954): First African American male lawyer in Richmond, California. He would later become the first African American male judge in Contra Costa County, California (1965).
Henry Alvarado (1896): First Hispanic American male judge in Contra Costa County, California (1923)
Christopher W. Bowen: First openly LGBT male appointed as a Judge of Contra Costa County Superior Court (2010)
 Benjamin T. Reyes III (1993): First Filipino American male appointed as a Judge of Contra Costa County Superior Court (2017)

Fresno County 

 Hugh W. Goodwin (1949): First African American male lawyer (c. 1950s) and judge in Fresno County, California (1976)
Tom Okawara: First Japanese American male lawyer in Fresno County, California
Armando Rodriguez (1965): First Latino American male judge in Fresno County, California (1975)
Simon Marootian: First male of Armenian descent to become a Judge of the Superior Court of Fresno County (1975)
Mikio Uchiyama (1953): First Japanese American male judge in Fresno County, California. He was also the first Japanese American male to become the City Attorney for Fowler, California.

Imperial County 

Cruz Reynoso (1959): First Latino American male lawyer to register with the Imperial County Bar Association
Matias R. Contreras: First Latino American male judge in Imperial County, California (upon his appointment to the municipal court in 1980)
Marco D. Nunez (2002): First openly LGBT male judge in Imperial County, California (2016)

Kern County 

 Gregory A. Pulskamp: First Muslim male appointed as a Judge of the Kern County Superior Court, California (2018)

Kings County 

 Thomas DeSantos: First Hispanic American male to serve as a Judge of the Kings County Superior Court (2003)

Los Angeles County 

Agustín Olvera: First (Mexican) male to serve as a Judge of the Court of Sessions for the newly-formed Los Angeles County (1850)
R. C. O. Benjamin (1884): First African American male lawyer in Los Angeles, California
Clarence B. Thomas: First African American male to graduate from USC Gould School of Law (1904) [Los Angeles County, California]
Sei Fujii: First Japanese-born male to graduate from USC Gould School of Law (1911)  [Los Angeles County, California]
James M. Alexander: First African American male to matriculate at the University of Southern California (1915) [Los Angeles County, California]
You Chung Hong (1923): First Chinese American male law graduate from the University of Southern California (1925)  [Los Angeles County, California]
Leon Whitaker (1928): First African American male to serve as the Deputy District Attorney for Los Angeles County, California (c. 1930s)
Alfred Paonessa: First Italian American male judge in Los Angeles County (upon his appointment to the Los Angeles Municipal Court in 1931)
Thomas L. Griffith (1931): First African American male lawyer admitted to the Los Angeles Bar Association (1950)
John Aiso (1941): First Japanese American male judge in Los Angeles County, California (1952)
Carlos Teran: First Mexican American male to serve as a municipal court judge in East Los Angeles (1957)
Delbert E. Wong (1948): First Chinese American male judge Los Angeles County, California (1959)
Marcus O. Tucker (1962): First African American male to serve as a Judge of the Long Beach Municipal Court (1976)
Fred W. Gabourie (1965): First Native American (Seneca people) male judge in Los Angeles County, California (1976)
Samuel L. Williams: First African American male to serve as the President of the Los Angeles County Bar Association (1977)
Johnnie Cochran (1963): First African American male to serve as the Assistant District Attorney in Los Angeles County, California (1978)
Stephen Lachs (1963): First openly LGBT male judge in Los Angeles County, California (1979)
Mel Red Recana (1974): First Filipino American male judge in Los Angeles County, California (1981)
Richard Paez (1972): First Mexican American male to serve as a federal judge in Los Angeles (1994)
Rocky Delgadillo: First Latino American male to serve as the City Attorney for Los Angeles (2001)
Rand Schrader: First openly LGBT male lawyer to work for the Los Angeles City Attorney's Office
Firdaus Dordi: First Zoroastrian male judge in Los Angeles County, California (2017)
Ricardo García: First Latino American male to serve as the Public Defender for Los Angeles County, California (2018)
Kevin Brazile (1984): First African American male to serve as the Presiding Judge of the Los Angeles County Superior Court (2019)
John W. Patton, Jr.: First African American male to serve as the President of the Beverly Hills Bar Association, Los Angeles County (1997)
Eric Webber: First openly LGBT male to serve as the President of the Los Angeles County Bar Association (c. 2013)
Roy Jimenez: First Latino American male to serve as the Co-President of the LGBT Bar Association of Los Angeles

Marin County 

 William H. Stephens (1967): First African American male judge in Marin County, California (c. 1979-1999)
Mark Andrew Talamantes (1997): First Latino American male judge in Marin County, California (2012)

Merced County 

 Paul C. Lo (1994): First Hmong American male judge in Merced County, California (2013)
Marc A. Garcia (1995): First Latino American male judge in Merced County, California (2007)

Monterey County 

 Albert Maldonado (1974): First Latino American male judge in Monterey County, California (1995)

Orange County 

 James O. Perez (1956): First Latino American male lawyer and judge in Orange County, California
Stephen K. Tamura: First Japanese American (and Asian American in general) male lawyer, county counsel and Superior Court Judge in Orange County, California.
John Nho Trong Nguyen: First Vietnamese American male to serve as a Judge of the Superior Court of Orange County (2000)

Placer County 

 Michael W. Jones: First Latino American male appointed as a Judge of the Placer County Superior Court, California (2012)
Todd D. Irby: First African American male appointed as a Judge of the Placer County Superior Court, California (2018)

Riverside County 

 Richard Fields: First African American male judge in Riverside County, California (2000)
Jack Lucky: First Asian American male (who is of Korean descent) judge in Riverside County, California (2008)
Godofredo (O.G.) Magno: First Filipino American male appointed as a Judge of the Riverside County Superior Court, California (2017)

Sacramento County 

 Nathaniel Colley (1948): First African American male lawyer in Sacramento, Sacramento County, California
 Mamoru Sakuma (1950): First Asian American male (Japanese American) judge in Sacramento County, California (1963)
 Lorenzo Patino: First Latino American male to serve as a municipal court judge in Sacramento County, California
Joginder Dhillon: First Sikh male appointed as a Judge of the Superior Court of Sacramento (2018)
Daniel J. Calabretta: First openly LGBT male appointed as a Judge of the Superior Court of Sacramento (2019)
Thien Ho: First Asian American male (of Vietnamese descent) to serve as the District Attorney for Sacramento County (2022)

San Benito County 

 Alfredo A. Garcia: First Hispanic American male judge in San Benito County, California

San Bernardino County 

Michael A. Ramos: First Hispanic American male to serve as the District Attorney for San Bernardino County, California (2002)
Winston S. Keh: First Filipino American male appointed as a Judge of the San Bernardino County Superior Court, California (2017)
Aruna P. Rodrigo (2008): First Sri Lankan American male appointed as a Judge of the San Bernardino County Superior Court, California (2021)

San Diego County 

 Joseph H. Stuart: First African American male lawyers in San Diego County, California (1890)
Duane E. Bennett: First African American male to become the City Attorney for Oceanside, San Diego County, California
Ataulfo “A.F.” Molina (1923): First Latino American male judge in San Diego County, California (1941)
Earl Ben Gilliam (1957): First African American male judge in San Diego County, California (1963)
James D. Floyd (1968): First African American male to graduate from the University of San Diego School of Law (1966)
Ernest Borunda: First Hispanic American male judge in the South Bay judicial district in San Diego County (1979)
Fred W. Alvarez: First Latino American male to serve as the President of the Bar Association of San Francisco (2000)
Jesus "Jesse" Rodriguez: First Hispanic American male to serve as the Assistant District Attorney for San Diego County, California (2003)
Ted Weathers: First openly LGBT male judge in San Diego County, California (2003)
Erik Weber (2012): First male with autism to graduate from the Cal Western School of Law and pass the California Bar Exam [San Diego County, California]

San Francisco County 

R. C. O. Benjamin (1884): First African American male lawyer admitted to the San Francisco Bar Association (1887)
Thomas Pearson: First African American male lawyer to practice in the U.S. District Court in San Francisco, California (1905)
Chan Chung Wing (1918): First Chinese American male lawyer in San Francisco, California
Harold Dobbs (1942): First Jewish male graduate of UC Hastings College of the Law. He would later found his own law firm and become co-founder of Mel's Drive-In. [San Francisco County, California]
William Jack Chow (1935): First Chinese American male to serve as a Deputy District Attorney in San Francisco County, California (1942)
Cecil F. Poole (1939): First African American male to serve as the Deputy District Attorney for San Francisco County, California (1949)
John W. Bussey (1931): First African American male judge in San Francisco County, California (1958)
 Harry Low (1955): First Asian American male judge in San Francisco County, California (1966)
Herb Donaldson (1957): First openly LGBT male judge in San Francisco County, California (1983)
David Smith Fox: First openly LGBT male to serve as the Deputy City Attorney in San Francisco County, California (1985)
 Luis Garcia: First Latino American male judge in San Francisco County, California
Everett Hewlett: First African American male to serve as a Commissioner of the San Francisco Superior Court (1986)
Michael G.W. Lee: First Asian American male to serve as the President of the San Francisco Bar Association (1990)
Raymond Marshall: First African American male to serve as the President of the San Francisco Bar Association (1993)
Jeff Adachi (1985): First Asian American male to serve as the San Francisco Public Defender (2003)
Frank H. Wu: First Asian American male to serve as the Dean of University of California, Hastings College of the Law (2010)
George Gascón: First Latino American male District Attorney of San Francisco County, California (2011)
Roger Chan: First openly LGBT and Korean American male to serve as a Judge of the San Francisco Superior Court, California (2016)
Alex Bastian: First Armenian American male prosecutor in San Francisco

San Joaquin County 

 Cruz F. Portillo (1956): First Hispanic American male to graduate and become a lawyer from the Humphrey College of Law [San Joaquin County, California] 
John Cruikshank (1963): First African American male lawyer and judge (1979) in San Joaquin County, California
Frank Kim: First Asian American male to serve as the Deputy District Attorney and a judge (1971) in San Joaquin County, California
Jose L. Alva: First Latino American male to serve as a Judge of the San Joaquin County Superior Court (2006)

San Mateo County 

 Phrasel L. Shelton: First African American male judge in San Mateo County, California (1976)
Jonathan Karesh (1985): First openly LGBT male to serve as the Presiding Judge of the San Mateo County Superior Court (2019)

Santa Barbara County 

 Frank Ochoa: First Latino American male judge in Santa Barbara County, California in the twentieth century (1983)

Santa Clara County 

 Wayne M. Kanemoto (1943): First Japanese American male lawyer in Santa Clara County, California
Delbert E. Wong (1948): First Chinese American male law graduate of Stanford University (1949) [Santa Clara County, California]
Maurice Hardeman (1955): First African American municipal court judge in Santa Clara County, California (1964). He is also the first African American male to open a law practice in San Jose, California (1955). 
James Chang (1967): First Chinese American male to serve as a Judge of Santa Clara County Superior Court (1989)
Thang Nguyen Barrett (1988): First Vietnamese American male to serve as the Deputy District Attorney in Santa Clara County, California (1989)
Rene Navarro (1976): First Hispanic American male elected as a Judge of the Santa Clara Superior Court (1995)
Randolf J. Rice: First openly LGBT male appointed as a Judge of the Santa Clara Superior Court (2001)
Sunil R. Kulkarni: First South Asian male appointed as a Judge of the Santa Clara Superior Court (2013)
Gabriel Garcia: First Latino American male lawyer in San Jose, California [Santa Clara County, California]

Santa Cruz County 

 Ron Ruiz (1965): First Latino American male to serve as the District Attorney of Santa Cruz County, California (1999)
John Salazar (1986): First Latino American male to serve as a Judge of the Superior Court of Santa Cruz County (2000)
Jerry Vinluan: First Filipino American male to serve as a Judge of the Superior Court of Santa Cruz County (2021)

Solano County 

 Lewis F. Brown (1970): First African American male lawyer in Solano County, California
 Osby Davis (1974): First African American male (a lawyer) to serve as a Solano County Board of Supervisor (1979-1993) and the Mayor of Vallejo, California (2007)
 Luis M. Villarreal (1976): First Hispanic American male judge in Solano County, California (1982)

Stanislaus County 

 Charles Edward Aguilar (1962): First Latino American male judge in Stanislaus County, California (1977)
Sonny Sandhu: First Asian-Pacific Islander male judge in Stanislaus County, California (2018)
Marcus L. Mumford: First African American male judge in Stanislaus County, California (2021)

Tulare County 

 Oscar Overr: First African American to serve as a Justice of the Peace in Allensworth, California (1914) [Tulare County, California]
Valeriano Saucedo: First Hispanic American male judge in Tulare County, California (2001)

Ventura County 

 Herbert Curtis: First African American male judge in Ventura County, California
Arturo F. Gutierrez: First Latino American male judge in Ventura County, California (1998)
Ferdinand P. Inumerable (1994): First Asian American male judge in Ventura County, California (2014)

See also 

 List of first minority male lawyers and judges in the United States

Other topics of interest 

 List of first women lawyers and judges in the United States
 List of first women lawyers and judges in California

References 

 
Minority, first
Minority, California, first
Lists of people from California
California lawyers
law
Legal history of California
Political history of California
Social history of California